Eugene Satterwhite Blease (1877-1963) was the chief justice of the South Carolina Supreme Court from 1931 to 1934.

Blease graduated from Newberry College in Newberry, South Carolina and then worked as a teacher. In 1899, he was admitted to the South Carolina bar. Blease practiced law in Saluda and was a member of the South Carolina House of Representatives from Saluda county in 1901 and 1902. He was Saluda County's state senator in 1905 and 1906. In September 1905, Blease shot and killed his brother-in-law, and was imprisoned until his acquittal on April 11, 1906.

After moving to Newberry, he was the mayor of Newberry in 1920 and 1921 and then served in the House from 1922 until 1924. In 1926 he was elected as an associate justice of the South Carolina Supreme Court and was elevated to Chief Justice in 1931. Because of his health, he issued a letter of resignation on March 28, 1934, as effective October 8, 1934. In 1942, he returned to politics but lost in a close election for the United States Senate to Burnet R. Maybank. He is buried at the Rosemont Cemetery in Newberry, South Carolina.

References

Justices of the South Carolina Supreme Court
Chief Justices of the South Carolina Supreme Court
1877 births
1963 deaths